Polygamous marriages are legally recognized for men in Saudi Arabia, in accordance with Islamic Sharia law, which allows for Muslim men to marry up to four wives, provided that he treats them equally and shares all his wealth equally. However, attitudes towards polygamy in Saudi Arabia have changed in recent decades and became very rare to practice it in the present times.

References 

Saudi Arabia
Society of Saudi Arabia
Women's rights in Saudi Arabia